Paloma brava may refer to:
Paloma brava (album), a 1986 album by Rocío Jurado
Paloma brava (film), a 1961 Mexican film by Rogelio A. González

See also
Rock pigeon or